The 1998 Faber Grand Prix was a women's tennis tournament played on indoor carpet courts in Hannover, in Germany that was part of Tier II of the 1998 WTA Tour. The tournament was held from 16 February until 22 February 1998. Unseeded Patty Schnyder won the singles title and earned $79,000 first-prize money.

Finals

Singles

 Patty Schnyder defeated  Jana Novotná 6–0, 2–6, 7–5
 It was Schnyder's 2nd title of the year and the 2nd of her career.

Doubles

 Lisa Raymond /  Rennae Stubbs defeated  Elena Likhovtseva /  Caroline Vis 6–1, 6–7, 6–3
 It was Raymond's 1st title of the year and the 10th of her career. It was Stubbs' 1st title of the year and the 14th of her career.

References

External links
 ITF tournament edition details
 Tournament draws

Faber Grand Prix
Faber Grand Prix
Faber
1998 in German women's sport